Kinnal Craft or Kinhal Craft, is a traditional wooden craft local to the town of Kinhal, or Kinnal, in Koppal District, Karnataka, India.

The town is famous for Kinhal toys and religious idols. Recently this Craft has been granted Geographical Indication and its GI Application number is 213*.

History
Kinhal was once a flourishing centre for crafts, the most well-known being carvings in wood. The famous mural paintings in the Pampapateshwara Temple, and the intricate work on the wooden chariot at Hampi, are said to be the work of the ancestors of the Kinhal artisans of today. Old paper tracings found in the ancestral house of one of the artisans further substantiates this belief. 

In 2007, students from the University of Glasgow and Glasgow School of Art in collaboration with the Crafts Council of Karnataka, facilitated a project with local students and craftsmen, in an attempt to revive the Kinhal craft.

Method

The artisans are called chitragara. Lightweight wood is used for the toys. The paste used for joining the various parts is made of tamarind seeds and pebbles. Jute rags, soaked, slivered into pieces, dried, powdered, and mixed with saw dust and tamarind seed paste is made into kitta. A mixture of pebble powder paste with liquid gum is used for embossing the ornamentation and jewellery on the body of the figure. Once the components of the figure are assembled, kitta is applied by hand all over, and small pieces of cotton are stuck on it with the tamarind paste. Over this is applied the pebble paste which forms the base for the application of paint. 

Previously, toys depicting people involved in various occupations were popular; now the preference is for figures, animals, and birds. Garuda, the epic bird, has 12 components while Lord Ganesha on a throne has 22 components. The styling is realistic and the designing and chiselling has a master touch. In the festival season, clay toys and images are made, often out of cowdung and sawdust.

See also
Channapatna toys
Navalgund Durries
Dharwad pedha
Udupi Mattu Gulla
Bidriware

References

External links
The Glasgow Kinnal Project – no longer valid
Book about the Kinhal Craft produced by Scottish team
 [Form GI-1 of Application No. 213 available at https://web.archive.org/web/20150320221220/http://ipindiaservices.gov.in/GirPublic/ViewApplicationDetails.aspx?AppNo=20&Index=0]

Indian woodwork
Culture of Karnataka
Wooden sculptures
Geographical indications in Karnataka